Her Sister from Paris is a 1925 American silent comedy film based upon the play The Twin Sister by Ludwig Fulda. It was directed by Sidney Franklin and stars Constance Talmadge, Ronald Colman, and George K. Arthur. Unlike many silent films, it is still extant.

The film's sets were designed by the art director William Cameron Menzies while the costumes were by Adrian, working on his first production.

Plot
As described in a film magazine reviews, Joseph  Weyringer, a writer of novels, comes to believe that his wife Helen is too domestic. She interrupts her husband and a quarrel follows. When she leaves him to return to her mother’s, she meets her twin sister at the station. The latter has come to Vienna to dance. An invitation comes to the sister, La Perry, to come to supper after her performance with Joseph whom she has never seen. She accepts, then sends Helen to impersonate her at the supper. Helen is believed to be the dancer by Joseph. She makes love to Joseph and proposes that they elope. He is persuaded to go to the same hotel where they had spent their honeymoon. When they are given the bridal suite, he confesses that he cannot go on because he loves his wife. He is then confronted with his wife (who is really his sister-in-law). Helen is satisfied that her husband still loves her.

Cast
 Constance Talmadge as Helen Weyringer / La Perry  
 Ronald Colman as Joseph Weyringer  
 George K. Arthur as Robert Well  
 Gertrude Claire as Anna, the Housekeeper 
 Mario Carillo as The King
 Ellinor Vanderveer as Theatre Patron

Reception
At that time films in the United States were subject to local censorship, and, after the Chicago Board of Censors initially recommended changes, the chief of the Chicago Police Department denied Her Sister from Paris a permit. One theater challenged the denial by filing for a writ of mandamus in state court and took a survey of its patrons which favored the showing of the film by a margin of 1000 to 5. In the end, the chief of police issued a permit after an agreement to make 7 changes, 6 of which revised or eliminated intertitles.

References

Bibliography
 Lea Jacobs. The Decline of Sentiment: American Film in the 1920s. University of California Press, 2008.

External links

Kramer, Fritzi, Her Sister from Paris (1925) A Silent Film Review at moviessilently.com
 (Library of Congress restored print)

1925 films
1926 comedy films
1926 films
Silent American comedy films
Films directed by Sidney Franklin
1920s English-language films
American black-and-white films
First National Pictures films
Films set in Vienna
American films based on plays
American silent feature films
Films about twin sisters
1925 comedy films
1920s American films